The paradoxes of material implication are a group of true formulae involving material conditionals whose translations into natural language are intuitively false when the conditional is translated as "if ... then ...". If natural language conditionals were understood in the same way, that would mean that the sentence "If the Nazis had won World War Two, everybody would be happy" is vacuously true. Given that such problematic consequences follow from a seemingly correct assumption about logic, they are called paradoxes. They demonstrate a mismatch between classical logic and robust intuitions about meaning and reasoning.

Paradox of entailment

As the best known of the paradoxes, and most formally simple, the paradox of entailment makes the best introduction.

In natural language, an instance of the paradox of entailment arises:
It is raining
And
It is not raining
Therefore
George Washington is made of rakes.

This arises from the principle of explosion, a law of classical logic stating that inconsistent premises always make an argument valid; that is, inconsistent premises imply any conclusion at all. This seems paradoxical because although the above is a logically valid argument, it is not sound (not all of its premises are true).

Construction
Validity is defined in classical logic as follows: 
An argument (consisting of premises and a conclusion) is valid if and only if there is no possible situation in which all the premises are true and the conclusion is false. 

For example a valid argument might run:
If it is raining, water exists (1st premise)
It is raining (2nd premise)
Water exists (Conclusion)

In this example there is no possible situation in which the premises are true while the conclusion is false. Since there is no counterexample, the argument is valid.

But one could construct an argument in which the premises are inconsistent. This would satisfy the test for a valid argument since there would be no possible situation in which all the premises are true and therefore no possible situation in which all the premises are true and the conclusion is false.

For example an argument with inconsistent premises might run:
It is definitely raining (1st premise; true)
It is not raining (2nd premise; false)
George Washington is made of rakes (Conclusion)

As there is no possible situation where both premises could be true, then there is certainly no possible situation in which the premises could be true while the conclusion was false. So the argument is valid whatever the conclusion is; inconsistent premises imply all conclusions.

Simplification
The classical paradox formulae are closely tied to conjunction elimination,

 

which can be derived from the paradox formulae, for example from (1) by importation.
In addition, there are serious problems with trying to use material implication as representing the English "if ... then ...". For example, the following are valid inferences:

 
 

but mapping these back to English sentences using "if" gives paradoxes.

The first might be read "If John is in London then he is in England, and if he is in Paris then he is in France. Therefore, it is true that either (a) if John is in London then he is in France, or (b) if he is in Paris then he is in England." Using material implication, if John is not in London then (a) is true; whereas if he is in London then, because he is not in Paris, (b) is true. Either way, the conclusion that at least one of (a) or (b) is true is valid.

But this does not match how "if ... then ..." is used in natural language: the most likely scenario in which one would say "If John is in London then he is in England" is if one does not know where John is, but nonetheless knows that if he is in London, he is in England. Under this interpretation, both premises are true, but both clauses of the conclusion are false.

The second example can be read "If both switch A and switch B are closed, then the light is on. Therefore, it is either true that if switch A is closed, the light is on, or that if switch B is closed, the light is on." Here, the most likely natural-language interpretation of the "if ... then ..." statements would be "whenever switch A is closed, the light is on," and "whenever switch B is closed, the light is on." Again, under this interpretation both clauses of the conclusion may be false (for instance in a series circuit, with a light that comes on only when both switches are closed).

See also 
 Connexive logics were designed to exclude the paradoxes of material implication
 Correlation does not imply causation
 Counterfactuals
 False dilemma
 Import-Export
 List of paradoxes
 Modus ponens
 The Moon is made of green cheese
 Relevance logic arose out of attempts to avoid these paradoxes
 Vacuous truth

References 

Bennett, J. A Philosophical Guide to Conditionals. Oxford: Clarendon Press. 2003.
Conditionals, ed. Frank Jackson. Oxford: Oxford University Press. 1991.
Etchemendy, J. The Concept of Logical Consequence. Cambridge: Harvard University Press. 1990.

Sanford, D. If P, Then Q: Conditionals and the Foundations of Reasoning. New York: Routledge. 1989.
Priest, G. An Introduction to Non-Classical Logic, Cambridge University Press. 2001.

Paradoxes
Semantics
Logical consequence